Lerums IS is a Swedish football club located in Lerum in Lerum Municipality, Västra Götaland County.

Background
Lerum IS is a sports club that was formed in 1927 and specialises in football. LIS run a ladies team and a large and relatively successful youth section, the latter of which has over 1000 members and is one of the biggest clubs in the Göteborg area.

Since their foundation, Lerums IS has participated mainly in the middle and lower divisions of the Swedish football league system.  The club currently plays in Division 3 Mellersta Götaland, which is the fifth tier of Swedish football. They play their home matches at the Aspevallen in Lerum.

Lerums IS are affiliated to the Göteborgs Fotbollförbund.

Season to season

Attendances

In recent seasons Lerums IS have had the following average attendances:

Footnotes

External links
 Lerums IS – Official website

Football clubs in Gothenburg
Association football clubs established in 1927
1927 establishments in Sweden
Football clubs in Västra Götaland County